Mends Street Jetty is located in South Perth in Western Australia. The jetty is on the southern shore of the Swan River in the section known as Perth Water. The ferry service is primarily used for accessing the Perth Zoo from the Perth central business district.

History
It is not known when the first jetty at Mends Street was built, however, with the opening of the Perth Zoo in October 1898 it was recognised that a regular cross-river ferry service was needed.

The service was run by Joseph Charles, who operated the Queen (later Empress) and the Princess. A few months later, Charles and his partner  Copley started operating the PS Duchess, a locally constructed vessel. Duchess made its inaugural run to Mends Street Jetty on 11 December 1898, and plied the route for the following 29 years.

Later services included a business operated by Jack Olsen and Claes Sutton, who ran a fleet including the Valfreda Valkyrie I and II, Valhalla and the Valdhana between jetties at Point Belches near The Narrows, Mends Street and Coode Street.

Services

Mends Street Jetty is served by Transperth ferry services to Elizabeth Quay operated by Captain Cook Cruises.

The jetty is also used for charter ferry services.

References

Jetties in Perth, Western Australia
South Perth, Western Australia